Holovousy is the name of several locations in the Czech Republic:

 Holovousy (Jičín District), a village in the Hradec Králové Region
 Holovousy (Plzeň-North District), a village in the Plzeň Region